Princess Dona Maria Adelaide of Braganza,   (31 January 191224 February 2012) was a member of the royal house of Braganza, daughter of Miguel, Duke of Braganza and Princess Maria Theresa of Löwenstein-Wertheim-Rosenberg.

Life 
Princess Maria Adelaide was born in Saint-Jean-de-Luz, France. Her godparents were King Manuel II, the last reigning king of Portugal (deposed in 1910), and his mother Queen Amélie. She was educated at the Sacre Coeur College in Riedenburg, Germany. She was married in Vienna, 13 October 1945, to Dr. Nicolaas van Uden (Venlo, 5 March 1921 – Lisbon, 5 February 1991) who was Dutch and who became a naturalized Portuguese citizen in 1975. Son of Adrian van Uden (Gerwen, 7 May 1893 – 24 December 1959) and wife Cornelia Antonia Baaijeens (Gorinchem, 7 September 1897 – 15 June 1979), daughter of Nicolaas Baaijeens and wife Helena Dam, Nicolaas van Uden was a medical biochemist and a great scientific authority in the field of yeast development.

Princess Maria Adelaide lived in Vienna, Austria, working as a nurse and social assistant. During World War II, when there were bombardments, she travelled at night to the place to provide aid to the victims. She was part of the Nazi resistance movement, and the Gestapo sentenced her to death . The Portuguese President of the Council of Ministers, António de Oliveira Salazar intervened with the Germans, claiming that Princess Maria Adelaide was a national heritage. This intervention of the Portuguese diplomacy resulted in the release and her immediate deportation, after which she settled in Switzerland. It was there that her brother Dom Duarte Nuno, Duke of Braganza lived with his wife Francisca. After the war, the family finally returned to Austria.

In 1949, Princess Maria Adelaide settled in Portugal. Meanwhile, her husband graduated in medicine from the University of Vienna and specialized in diseases of the skin. But when Dr. Nicolaas van Uden arrived in Portugal his qualifications were not recognised as equivalent to the Portuguese ones, and therefore he could not practice medicine. As there was no other solution, he went to work for a small research laboratory at the Faculty of Science and stayed there for several years, until the opportunity to work in partnership with the Calouste Gulbenkian Foundation arose. Due to such a collaboration the Gulbenkian Science Institute was born and it promotes scientific research in various areas since the 1950s to date.

The van Uden family originally lived in the Quinta do Carmo, in Almada. Princess Maria Adelaide began working as a social assistant in some initiatives, because that area of Trafaria in Monte da Caparica, was very poor. She developed an intensive career, especially in the area whereby newborn poor or orphaned children were collected and then taken to the D. Nunes Alvares Pereira Foundation, of which she was President.

Her nephew D. Duarte Pio, Duke of Braganza, is the present head of the House of Braganza and, therefore, a claimant to the former Portuguese throne. She was the last surviving grandchild of Miguel I of Portugal and last surviving great-grandchild of John VI of Portugal.

Issue

Honours
  Portuguese Royal Family: Dame Grand Cross of the Order of Saint Isabel
 : Grand Officer of the Order of Merit (31 January 2012)

Ancestry

References

Bibliography
Ochoa, Raquel, A Infanta Rebelde, Oficina do Livro, 2011.

1912 births
2012 deaths
Dames of the Order of Saint Isabel
Grand Officers of the Order of Merit (Portugal)
House of Braganza
People from Saint-Jean-de-Luz
Portuguese centenarians
Portuguese infantas
Women centenarians